Steffen Korell (born 27 October 1971 in Zweibrücken) is a German former professional football who played as a defender. Since 2007 he is a director with Borussia Mönchengladbach.

References

1971 births
Living people
Association football defenders
German footballers
FC 08 Homburg players
SC Freiburg players
Borussia Mönchengladbach players
Bundesliga players
2. Bundesliga players
People from Zweibrücken
Footballers from Rhineland-Palatinate